The Jakarta Anniversary Tournament was a football tournament hosted by Indonesia. The tournament was established in 1970 to commemorate the establishment of Jakarta Government.

Results

References 

  
International association football competitions hosted by Indonesia
1970 establishments in Indonesia
Recurring sporting events established in 1970